Rise Above: 24 Black Flag Songs to Benefit the West Memphis Three is a 2002 tribute album. It consists of covers of Black Flag songs performed by the Rollins Band, with vocalists from various well-known rock, hip hop, punk and metal artists (as well as certain members of Black Flag) singing. All money raised from sales of the album were donated to the legal funds of the West Memphis Three.

Track listing

Personnel

Band
Marcus Blake – bass guitar (tracks 1–23); backing vocals (tracks 1, 10, 14, and 22)
Jason Mackenroth – drums (tracks 1–23); backing vocals (tracks 1, 10, 14, and 22)
Jim Wilson – guitar (tracks 1–23); backing vocals (tracks 1, 10, 14, and 22)

Vocalists
Ryan Adams – vocals and instrumentation (track 24)
Tom Araya – vocals (track 16)
Tim Armstrong – lead vocals (track 19); backing vocals (tracks 1, 10, and 14)
Cedric Bixler-Zavala – vocals (track 5)
Exene Cervenka – vocals (track 8)
Casey Chaos – vocals (track 13)
Chuck D – intro and backing vocals (track 1)
Chuck Dukowski – vocals (track 18)
David "Pappy" Donaldson Sr. – backing vocals (track 10)
Ice-T – vocals (track 15)
Neil Fallon – vocals (track 4)
Lars Frederiksen – lead vocals (track 19); backing vocals (tracks 1, 10, and 14)
Matt Freeman – backing vocals (tracks 1, 10, and 14)
Denny Harvey – backing vocals (tracks 1, 10, 14, and 22)
Josh Homme – backing vocals (tracks 1, 10, 14, and 22)
Lemmy Kilmister – vocals (track 17)
Inger Lorre – backing vocals (track 21)
Brad McDonald – backing vocals (tracks 1, 10, and 14)
Jeff Moreira – vocals (track 6)
Keith Morris – vocals (track 2)
Nick Oliveri – lead vocals (track 9); backing vocals (tracks 1, 10, 14, and 22)
Mike Patton – lead vocals (track 14)
Iggy Pop – vocals (track 3)
Kira Roessler – backing vocals (tracks 1, 10, 14, and 22)
Henry Rollins – lead vocals (tracks 1, 8, 10, 20, 21, 22, and 23); backing vocals (track 14)
Corey Taylor – lead vocals (track 7); backing vocals (tracks 1, 10, 14, and 22)
Tommie Vaughn – backing vocals (track 10)
Dean Ween – vocals (track 12); outro guitar (track 21)
Hank Williams III – vocals (track 11)

Production 
Raina Alomar – layout and design
Bill Bennett – recording engineer
Mike Curtis – photos, guitar technician
Ben Kersten – recording engineer; backing vocals (track 10)
Stephen Marcussen – mastering
Heidi May – executive producer
Clif Norrell – mixing engineer
Matt Petrich – recording engineer; backing vocals (track 10)
Bruce Robb – recording engineer
Dee Robb – recording engineer
Henry Rollins – producer, photos

References

2002 compilation albums
Rollins Band albums
Charity albums
Black Flag (band) tribute albums
Sanctuary Records compilation albums
Collaborative albums
West Memphis Three